Below is a list of airports, airfields and heliports in Finland, grouped by type and sorted by location.

Airports 

ICAO location identifiers link to pages from the Finnish Aeronautical Information Service.

Names shown in bold indicate airports with scheduled passenger service on commercial airlines. For such airports, the number of passengers and a percentage of the total number of passengers on commercial airports in Finland in 2017 is given.

See also 
 Finnish Air Force
 List of airports by ICAO code: E#EF - Finland
 List of the largest airports in the Nordic countries
 Transport in Finland
 Wikipedia:WikiProject Aviation/Airline destination lists: Europe#Finland

References 
 Finavia
 lentopaikat.net
 
 
  – includes IATA codes
  – IATA and ICAO codes
  – ICAO codes

Footnotes

External links

Finland
 
 
Finland